is a Japanese footballer of North Korean descent.

Personal life
He is the younger brother of fellow professional footballer Han Yong-thae.

Career statistics

Club
.

Notes

References

2000 births
Living people
Association football people from Tokyo
Korea University alumni
North Korean footballers
Japanese footballers
Association football forwards
J3 League players
YSCC Yokohama players